Youlia Fedossova  (born 1 July 1988) is a retired Russian-born French tennis player.

In her career, Fedossova won four doubles titles on the ITF Women's Circuit. On 13 August 2007, she reached her best singles ranking of world No. 107. On 26 July 2010, she peaked at No. 171 in the WTA doubles rankings.

Fedossova moved to France when she was three years old.
She competed in the main draw of the French Open in singles 2005, 2006, 2007, 2008, and in doubles 2005, 2006, 2007, 2008, 2010 but lost each time in the first round.

At the 2006 US Open, Fedossova upset 28th seed Anabel Medina Garrigues in the first round, 6–2, 6–1. At the 2007 Australian Open, she also reached the second round.

Fedossova retired from professional tennis in 2011.

ITF finals

Singles (0–3)

Doubles (4–5)

References

External links
 
 

1988 births
French female tennis players
Living people
Russian emigrants to France
Tennis players from Paris